Buried Alive is a promotional single from American heavy metal band Avenged Sevenfold's fifth album Nightmare.

Background
In September 2011, the band announced plans for a music video for this single. They tried to get Rob Zombie to direct the video, but he declined due to being focused on another project. The band did not announce any other plan for a music video for the song.

The single was released the September 20, 2011, although the lyric video for it had been already released on July 17, 2010 on the band's official YouTube channel. The lyric video has gotten 16.5 million views as of August 19, 2016. The "Buried Alive tour" (the promotion tour for Nightmare) takes its name from this song.

In 2014, a demo for the song leaked. The demo features The Rev on lead vocals and some different lyrics, as well as some breaks where M. Shadows sang in the original. The demo was probably an early version of the song written by The Rev solely, before M. Shadows finished it for Nightmare.

Personnel
Avenged Sevenfold
M. Shadows – lead vocals
Zacky Vengeance – rhythm guitar, backing vocals
The Rev – drum arrangement
Synyster Gates – lead guitar, backing vocals
Johnny Christ – bass
Session musicians
Mike Portnoy – drums
Stevie Blacke – strings, string arrangement

Charts

Weekly charts

Year-end charts

References

Avenged Sevenfold songs
2011 singles
Song recordings produced by Mike Elizondo
2010 songs
Songs written by M. Shadows